The 2021–22 UTEP Miners men's basketball team represented the University of Texas at El Paso during the 2021–22 NCAA Division I men's basketball season. The team was led by first-year head coach Joe Golding, and played their home games at the Don Haskins Center in El Paso, Texas as a member of Conference USA.

Previous season
The Miners finished the 2020–21 season 12–12, 8–8 in C-USA play to finish in fifth place in West Division. They lost in the second round of the C-USA tournament to Florida Atlantic.

On April 6, 2021, Rodney Terry left for UTEP to accept an assistant coaching position at Texas. The Miners announced the hiring of Abilene Christian head coach Joe Golding as its next head coach on April 13.

Offseason

Departures

Incoming transfers

Recruiting class of 2021

Recruiting class of 2022

Roster

Schedule and results

|-
!colspan=12 style=| Non-conference regular season

|-
!colspan=12 style=|Conference USA regular season

|-
!colspan=12 style=|Conference USA tournament

|-
!colspan=12 style=| The Basketball Classic
|-

Source

See also
 2021–22 UTEP Miners women's basketball team

References

UTEP Miners men's basketball seasons
UTEP Miners
UTEP Miners men's basketball
UTEP Miners men's basketball
UTEP